Pietà with Saint Francis and Saint Mary Magdalene is a 1602-1607 oil on canvas painting by Annibale Carraci. Now in the Louvre, it was looted from the Mattei family chapel in San Francesco a Ripa in Rome by Napoleon's troops in 1797 and was not returned at the end of the Napoleonic Wars.

It is thought to be the work referred to in a letter by Giovanni Battista Agucchi reproduced in Carlo Cesare Malvasia's Felsina Pittrice – other references in Malvasia date the letter to 1607. Agucchi's words suggest he was referring to a recent work by Annibal and – though the letter does not refer explicitly to the work now in the Louvre – the context suggests that the Louvre work is the only one to which Agucchi could be referring. A second undated letter by Agucchi explicitly refers to the Pietà in the Mattei chapel, whilst another passage in Felsina confirms that that Pietà was one of Carracci's last works but states that others had dated the work much earlier.

Tietze, Mahon, Cavalli and Posner have all argued that 1607 is much too late a date for the work. However, a 1603 Domenichino copy of the work on copper backs a date very close to Carracci's death or at least just before Domenichino made the copy, although it seems to disprove the 1607 date in Agucchi's letter. It replaces Francis of Assisi with Joseph of Arimathea, perhaps suggesting that Carracci originally painted Joseph but modified it to Francis once he had a definite location for the work, namely in a church dedicated to Francis, and that Domenichino made the copy before Carraci made the modification. A preparatory drawing by Annibale (now in the Jenisch Museum in Vevey) with Joseph but without Francis was thought to confirm this theory until a 1994 X-ray of the Louvre work showed the absence of pentimenti. Another theory suggests that the area now occupied by Francis was blank when the copy was made, with Domenichino adding a figure of Joseph (either from his own invention or from rejected preparatory drawings by Annibale) and with Annibale later filling the blank with a figure of Francis

References

Paintings by Annibale Carracci
Paintings in the Louvre by Italian artists
Carracci
Paintings of Francis of Assisi
Paintings depicting Mary Magdalene